The 2022 Il Lombardia was a one-day road cycling race that took place on 8 October 2022 in the Italian region of Lombardy. It was the 31st and final event of the 2022 UCI World Tour and was the 115th edition of Il Lombardia.

Teams
Twenty-five teams, consisting of 18 UCI WorldTeams and 7 UCI ProTeams, participated in the race. Each team entered seven riders.

UCI WorldTeams

 
 
 
 
 
 
 
 
 
 
 
 
 
 
 
 
 
 

UCI ProTeams

Results

References

Sources

 

Il Lombardia
Il Lombardia
Il Lombardia
Giro di Lombardia